was a professional Go player.

Biography
Keizo Suzuki was a promising Japanese go player – one of the "Three Crows" of the 1940s and early 1950s. He died a premature death at 18 from tuberculosis.

Sources
Sensei's Library

External links
GoBase profile
Sensei's Library profile

1927 births
1945 deaths
Japanese Go players
20th-century deaths from tuberculosis
Tuberculosis deaths in Japan